The Eocardiidae are an extinct family of caviomorph rodents from South America. The family is probably ancestral to the living family Caviidae, which includes cavies, maras, and capybaras and their relatives. McKenna and Bell (1997) divided eocardiids into two subfamilies, Luantinae for two of the oldest genera (Asteromys and Luantus) and Eocardiinae for remaining genera. Kramarz (2006) has recommended the abandonment of these subfamilies, as the genera placed in Luantinae appear to represent basal eocardiids, rather than a specialized side branch. The latter hypothesis had been proposed by Wood and Patterson (1959).

Fossils of the family were found in the Colhuehuapian to Friasian Pinturas, Sarmiento, Santa Cruz, Río Jeinemeiní and Collón Curá Formations of Argentina and the Cura-Mallín Group of Chile.

References

Bibliography 
 
 Wood, A.E. and Patterson, B. 1959. Rodents of the Deseadan Oligocene of Patagonia and the beginnings of South American rodent evolution. Bulletin of the Museum of Comparative Zoology 120:281-428.

Further reading 
 McKenna, Malcolm C., and Bell, Susan K. 1997. Classification of Mammals Above the Species Level. Columbia University Press, New York, 631 pp. 

Hystricognath rodents
Prehistoric rodent families
Miocene mammals of South America
Colhuehuapian
Santacrucian
Friasian
Miocene first appearances
Miocene extinctions
Taxa named by Florentino Ameghino